NA-71 Narowal-I is a constituency for the National Assembly of Pakistan. It comprises the Zafarwal Tehsil and a majority of Shakargarh Tehsil, apart from Bara Manga, Kanjroor, and Dudhu Chak that are included in NA-78. The Shakargarh areas are taken from the now-abolished Constituency NA-116.

Members of Parliament

2018-2022: NA-77 Narowal-I

Election 2002 

General elections were held on 10 Oct 2002. Muhammad Nasir Khan of PML-Q won by 32,104 votes.

Election 2008 

General elections were held on 18 Feb 2008. Sumaira Naz of PML-N won by 59,688 votes.

Election 2013 

General elections were held on 11 May 2013. Mian Muhammad Rasheed of PML-N won by 71,493 votes and became the  member of National Assembly.

Election 2018 
General elections were held on 25 July 2018.

See also
NA-70 Sialkot-V
NA-72 Narowal-II

References

External links 
Election result's official website
Delimitation 2018 official website Election Commission of Pakistan

77
77